The  took place during Takeda Shingen's campaign to take over Shinano Province. His army, led by Sanada Yukitaka, began besieging the castle in 1550. The defending lord, Murakami Yoshikiyo, held out until the following year, but his garrison suffered over 1000 casualties, and was ultimately forced to surrender.

References

Turnbull, Stephen (1998). 'The Samurai Sourcebook'. London: Cassell & Co.

Toishi 1550
1550 in Japan
1551 in Japan
Conflicts in 1550
Conflicts in 1551
Toishi 1550